Cajsalisa Ejemyr (born 7 November 1978 in Stockholm, Sweden) is a Swedish singer and actress.

Cajsalisa performed the song "Du gör mig hel igen" by Robyn in Sweden's preselection for Eurovision Song Contest 1997, Melodifestivalen 1997. The song ended up in 4th place.

Filmography 
Jungfruresan (1988)
Bert: The Last Virgin (1995) as Victoria
Skilda världar (1996) (TV-series)
Svenska hjältar (1997)
Vita lögner (1997) (TV-series)
Nya tider (1999) (TV-series)

Discography

Albums
Först nu (1997)
Vad jag vill och lite till (1999)
Either Way (2003)

Singles

References

External links 

1978 births
Swedish television actresses
Living people
21st-century Swedish singers
21st-century Swedish women singers
Melodifestivalen contestants of 1997